María Teresa Josefa Antonia Joaquina Rodríguez del Toro Alayza (15 October 1781 – 22 January 1803), was the Spanish-born wife of Simón Bolívar. After only two years of engagement and eight months of marriage, she died after contracting yellow fever at 21 years of age. Bolívar swore and kept his promise to never remarry. According to historians, and to Bolívar himself, her death was a turning point in his life that put him in the path to become the liberator of six Latin American nations and the forefather of the Latin American integration process.

Biography 
María Teresa was the only daughter of Bernardo Rodríguez del Toro y Ascanio, born in Caracas, Venezuela in the heart of a family with origins in Teror, Canary Islands, and Benita de Alayza Medrano, from Valladolid, Spain. She was born in Madrid on 15 October 1781, during the reign of Charles III. María Teresa was deeply linked to Caraquenian society. Her father was the son of the second Marquess del Toro, Francisco Rodríguez del Toro e Isturiz (Governor and Captain General of the Province of Venezuela), and brother of the third Marquess, Sebastián Rodríguez del Toro y Ascanio (Major of Caracas), whose title was inherited by María Teresa's first cousin Francisco Rodríguez del Toro (who would become the first Commander in Chief of Venezuela's independence army). By her mother's side, María Teresa was a niece of the Marquess of Inicio and Count of Rebolledo. Upon her mother's death, María Teresa, though of a young age, took care of her brothers and helped her father and her cousin, Pedro Rodríguez del Toro, in matters related to the administration of goods and haciendas.  Various studies and biographies gloss the recreation of the myth of María Teresa:

Relationship with Simón Bolívar 
María Teresa met Simón Bolívar in Madrid in 1800. Bolívar had been sent to Spain at the age of 17 to continue his studies. Bolívar was living at the time at the residence of the Marquess de Ustariz, whom Bolívar called his "tutor". There he met María Teresa, who was two years his elder, and with whom he was related throughout various family lines. In August 1800, María Teresa accepted Bolívar's courtship, who described her as "a jewel without defects, valuable without calculation." María Teresa's father took his daughter to Bilbao and a short while later, in March 1801, Bolívar also moved to that city, and then to Paris.

On 5 April 1802, upon returning to Spain, Bolívar proposed formally to María Teresa. It is speculated that María Teresa's father, appeased by the formal engagement, and added to the value of Bolívar’s estate at 200,000 duros, gave his permission and blessing to the couple. Bolívar proposed to María Teresa that they would marry that same year at the Port of A Coruña. Shortly after, on 30 March 1802, Bolívar granted Pedro Rodríguez del Toro the power of attorney to subscribe in his name the marriage contract. In consideration of "her distinguished birth, her virginity, her personal qualities" and her disposition to leave Spain to accompany Bolívar, his lawyers placed a value on María Teresa of 100,000 reales, approximately a tenth of Bolívar's fortune.

Matrimony 
The marriage certificate reads as follows:

Twenty days later, the couple moved to La Coruña. On 15 June 1802, the recently-married couple left to Caracas, where they arrived the 12 July at La Guaira. There María Teresa was welcomed not only by Bolívar's family, but by her own Rodríguez del Toro relatives. A few months later, María Teresa fell sick to "malign fevers," identified indistinctly in the present day as yellow fever or paludism. The couple then returned to the Casa del Vínculo in Caracas, where she died on 22 January 1803, after eight months of marriage and two years of engagement.

Death and promise 
After having lost his parents as a child, and having lived a lonely childhood, María Teresa represented for Bolívar a last and definitive attempt to lay down emotional roots, an attempt marked by tragedy. The pain caused by this unexpected and premature death would lead Bolívar to avoid any close emotional bond in the future.

The oath of not remarrying again that Bolívar pronounced at that time is considered by his biographers as a rebellious act against the pain derived from the unconditional surrender of his emotional defenses. Even though he would have many lovers in the future, he faithfully fulfilled his promise. Bolívar's desperation led to fears that he would take his life. Bolívar, however, made a second trip to Europe to mitigate his immense grief. In Madrid he had a moving reunion with his father-in-law, Bernardo, which Bolívar would always remember. In company of María Teresa's first cousin , Bolívar travelled to Paris, where he came into contact with his old teacher Simón Rodríguez. This encounter would be of vital importance to Bolívar's life since Rodríguez, observing the anguish of his former disciple, guided him into political interests as a way to overcome the void left by María Teresa's death. Per his own words, this would lead him to follow "Mars' chariot" instead of "Ceres' plow." In 1828, analyzing the influence his wife's death had on him, Bolívar confesses: 

In relation to María Teresa's death the eminent Spanish biographer Salvador de Madariaga wrote:

Resting place 
Upon her death, María Teresa's remains were buried in the Bolívar family pantheon at the Caracas Cathedral with Bolívar's parents and forebearers. When Bolívar's remains were repatriated from Santa Marta, Colombia, in December 1842, they were buried right next to his wife's. There they remained for 34 years until 28 October 1876, until when Bolivar's body was transferred to the National Pantheon. Simultaneously, a series of sculptures were started for María Teresa and Bolívar's parents, which would be located in the Holy Trinity Chapel in the Metropolitan Cathedral of Caracas. These were entrusted to Italian sculpturist Pietro Tenerani. In 1930 an allegorical sculpture by Victorio Macho showing Bolívar protecting his wife and parents was added to the monument.

Portrayals in popular culture 
María Teresa and Bolívar's relationship was portrayed by María Valverde and Edgar Ramírez in Alberto Arvelo's 2013 film The Liberator.

In the fourth episode of the third season of the Spanish TV series, El Ministerio del Tiempo, Bolívar is aided by the time-travelling agents to find María Teresa. This is considered fundamental to trigger the series of events that would make Bolívar the Liberator of South America.

The relationship is also portrayed by the joint Netflix-Caracol Television series Bolívar with Irene Esser and José Ramón Barreto in the roles of María Teresa and Simón Bolívar.

Notes

External links 

 Biography of María Teresa Rodríguez del Toro y Alayza (in Spanish)

References 

1781 births
1803 deaths
18th-century Spanish women